The Wolf of Ansbach was a man-eating wolf that attacked and killed an unknown number of people in the Principality of Ansbach in 1685, then a part of the Holy Roman Empire.

History
Initially a nuisance preying on livestock, the wolf soon began attacking children. The citizens of Ansbach believed the animal to be a werewolf, a reincarnation of their late and cruel Bürgermeister, whose recent death had gone unlamented. During an organized hunt, the locals succeeded in driving the wolf from a nearby forest and chasing it down with dogs until it leaped into an uncovered well for protection. Trapped, the wolf was slain, and its carcass paraded through the city marketplace. It was dressed in a man's clothing and, after severing its muzzle, the crowd placed a mask, wig, and beard upon its head, giving it the appearance of the former Bürgermeister. The wolf's body was then hanged from a gibbet for all to see until it underwent preservation for permanent display at a local museum.

Franz Ritter von Kobell and other writers also wrote poems about the wolf and its actions.

See also
List of wolf attacks
List of wolves
Wolf hunting
Wolves in folklore, religion and mythology
Beast of Gévaudan

References

Further reading
 Der Werwolf, by Wilhelm Hertz (Internet Archive, in German)
On the Nightmare, by Ernest Jones

Deaths due to wolf attacks
1685 in the Holy Roman Empire
1680s in the Holy Roman Empire
Man-eaters
Individual wolves
Individual wild animals
Ansbach